When Father Papered the Parlour is a popular song, written and composed by R. P. Weston and Fred J. Barnes in 1910. It was performed by comedian Billy Williams, and was one of his most successful hits.

References 

1912 - The Man In The Velvet Suit, Huntington Historical Society.
Fred Barnes Bibliography

1910 songs
Songs written by R. P. Weston
Songs written by Fred J. Barnes